Darnah Province (called in Italian Provincia italiana di Derna) was one of the provinces of Libya under Italian rule. It was established in 1937 with the official name: "Commissariato Generale Provinciale di Derna". Derna province was called  only "Darnah District" after World War II.

Characteristics

Derna province was located in northern Italian Libya, next to Egypt. It was a semi-arid area near the Mediterranean coast, with a fertile plateau around ancient Cyrene, but in the interior it was a desert. Its administrative center was the small city of Derna on the Mediterranean coast.

It was divided in 3 "circondari" (sections):

 Derna
 Apollonia
 Tobruk

The province from 1939 was considered officially part of the Kingdom of Italy, with the same laws. It was one of the 4 new Italian provinces of the so-called Quarta Sponda (Fourth Shore). Indeed, on January 9, 1939, the colony of Italian Libya was incorporated into "metropolitan Italy" and thereafter considered an integral part of the Italian state (the French, in 1848, had incorporated French Algeria in the same manner).

In the coast of the province was built in 1937-1938 the eastern section of the Litoranea Balbia, that went from Tripoli to the border of Egypt. Some Italian colonists moved to live in a group of new villages after 1938: they increased local agricultural production, but British invasion during World War II destroyed all improvements.

The car tag for the Italian province of Derna was DE.

Population in Province of Derna
According to the 1936 census, which allowed citizens to declare their ethnicity, Derna's native population was made up of 94.4% Arabs, 1.8% Turks, 0.7% Blacks, 0.2% Berbers, and 2.9% Others.

According to the 1939 Italian Census of Libya, these were the main population data:

References

See also
 Tripoli Province
 Benghazi Province
 Misurata Province (Italian Libya)
 Military Territory of the South (Italian Libya)
 Italian Libya
 Fourth Shore 
 Via Balbia

Provinces of Libya (1937)